Kuresoi Constituency is a former electoral constituency in Kenya. The constituency was established for the 1997 elections. In 2010, it was split into Kuresoi North Constituency and Kuresoi South Constituency

The Kuresoi constituencies are an agriculturally productive area with large scale plantation of tea in the south western parts of the constituency, pyrethrum and potatoes in the central and northern parts of the constituencies. More than 10,000 hectares of land are under tea growing in the south western parts.

The constituencies have a tea industry, Kiptagich Tea Factory, which processes and packs tea grown in the plantations and also those sold to the factory by the local small scale farmers. The industry is owned by the former president, Daniel T. Moi and it provides employment directly and indirectly to more than 2,500 individuals.

The constituencies are home to different ethnic groups like the Kalenjins, Kikuyus and Kisii community.

History 
Kuresoi Constituency experienced tribal skirmishes after the 1992, 1997, and 2007 general elections.

Members of Parliament

Locations and wards

References

External links 
Map of the constituency

Former constituencies of Kenya
Constituencies in Rift Valley Province
1997 establishments in Kenya
Constituencies established in 1997